Unspecific peroxygenase (aromatic peroxygenase, mushroom peroxygenase, haloperoxidase-peroxygenase, Agrocybe aegerita peroxidase) is an enzyme with systematic name substrate:hydrogen peroxide oxidoreductase (RH-hydroxylating or -epoxidising). This enzyme catalyses the following chemical reaction

 RH + H2O2  ROH + H2O

Unspecific peroxygenase is a heme-thiolate protein comparable to Cytochrome P450 in the ability to catalyze a variety of P450 reactions (hence "unspecific"), but forms a unique, solely fungal, protein family of extracellular enzymes.

References

External links 

EC 1.11.2